Kaya is a Bulgarian reggae band. 

The idea of forming the band was first hatched by bass guitarist Georgi Borisov on the day of the 1999 solar eclipse. At the time, 20-year-old Borisov was wandering among several garage bands who were not responding favorably to his easygoing style, which ultimately led him to form his own group later that year.

Over the coming years, as Kaya went through more than 20 members, all of which contributing to its present style, the band evolved to embrace ska and funk elements as well as ethnic dance-pop,  releasing two albums in the process.

After a 10-year hiatus, during which most members became parents, the band reunited in 2021 to take part in Toplofest, a new music, theatre, and circus arts festival in Sofia.

Discography
Demo Sessions (2002)
Legalno (2003)
Live at O'Shipka (2005)

References

Musical groups established in 1999
1999 establishments in Bulgaria